is a town in Tagawa District, Fukuoka Prefecture, Japan.

It was established on March 6, 2006, by the merger of the former towns of Akaike, Hōjō and Kanada, all from Tagawa District.

Mount Fukuchi stands at the northern tip of the town. The population density is 607.5 people per km².

The town is famous for Agano ware (上野焼 Agano-yaki), a type of pottery.

References

External links

Town of Fukuchi 

Towns in Fukuoka Prefecture